Riverwood Academy Awards is an annual Kenyan film award founded by Mwaniki Mageria. It was formed with a goal  to  recognize and celebrate local productions ,low budget film making and nurture talent by creating opportunities for training  players in the industry on how to tell Kenyan stories in a Kenyan way. Riverwood Academy Awards started  on 17 March 2014. The first River wood Awards was held at Alliance Francaise and well known people in film industry attended also the former Cabinet Secretary of Sports, Culture and the Arts; Dr. Hassan Wario Arero was among  the guest of honors who attended.

Riverwood Awards 2014 
BEST SCRIPTWRITER

 Susan Kadide – Stara

Best Sound

 Iya Embasna

Best Editing

 Godrey Kimotho – Ithe wa Mwana

Best Original Score

 24Th Anniversary

Best Cinematography

 Gicagi

Best Supporting Actress in a tv Series

 Ruth Wacuka – Housemates

Best Supporting Actor in a tv Series

 Alex Mwaura – Maisha Bure

Best Lead Actress in a tv Series

 Janet Mbunga – Housemates

Best Lead Actor in a tv Series

 Samuel Kaguora –Maisha Bure

Best tv Series

 Maisha Bure

Best Supporting Actor in a Feature Film

 Jonathan Mbithi – ala Makai

Best Supporting Actress in a Feature Film

 Margaret Wambui- Wretched

Best Lead Actor in a Feature Film

 Thomas Oyolo – Mheshimiwa

Best Lead Actress in a Feature Film

 Muthoni Thiongo – Tamed

Best Director
 Mwendwa Mutua – Tamed

Best Feature
 Ithe wa Mwana

Riverwood Awards 2017-2018

References 

Film awards articles needing an infobox